Garrett Roe (born February 22, 1988) is an American professional ice hockey left winger who currently plays for the ZSC Lions of the National League (NL). He was selected 183rd overall by the Los Angeles Kings in the 2008 NHL Entry Draft.

Playing career 
Roe played for the Indiana Ice of the USHL before embarking on a four-year NCAA career at St. Cloud State University in 2007. He left St. Cloud as the school's all-time assist leader and third all-time in points scored. After graduating in 2011, he spent his first years of professional hockey in the AHL, playing for the Adirondack Phantoms.

Roe signed a deal with EC Salzburg of the Austrian elite league EBEL for the 2013-14 campaign.

He joined EHC München of the German DEL on a one-year contract on June 5, 2014, following head coach Don Jackson from fellow Red Bull sponsored EC Salzburg. In München, he recorded 13 goals and 38 assists in 51 games which ranked him ninth in the DEL in scoring.

Roe moved to Sweden for the 2015–16 season, signing with Linköpings HC of the country's top-tier competition SHL.

On April 27, 2017, Roe agreed to a two-year contract with EV Zug of the National League (NL). At the completion of a successful stint with Zug, Roe opted to continue in Switzerland agreeing to a two-year contract with rival club, ZSC Lions, on April 24, 2019. On February 17, 2021, the Lions signed Roe to an early two-year contract extension through to the end of the 2022/23 season.

Career statistics

Regular season and playoffs

International

Awards and honors

References

External links

1988 births
Adirondack Phantoms players
American men's ice hockey left wingers
Ice hockey people from Virginia
Indiana Ice players
Living people
Linköping HC players
Los Angeles Kings draft picks
EHC München players
Ice hockey players at the 2018 Winter Olympics
Olympic ice hockey players of the United States
People from Vienna, Virginia
St. Cloud State Huskies men's ice hockey players
EC Red Bull Salzburg players
Sportspeople from Fairfax County, Virginia
EV Zug players